Stephen Sama (born 5 March 1993) is professional footballer who last played as a centre back for Accrington Stanley. Born in Cameroon, he represented Germany at youth international level.

Youth career
Sama played two years of youth football for the teams of Schwarz-Weiß Eppendorf, SG Wattenscheid 09, VfL Bochum and Borussia Dortmund, prior to joining Liverpool in 2009 to play for their U18 and then later, their U21 team. He signed a contract extension with Liverpool in 2011, until June 2014. Despite being at Liverpool for 5 years, he never played a senior game for the English team.

Club career

VfB Stuttgart
On 2 September 2014, Sama signed a contract until June 2016 with VfB Stuttgart II. He made his professional debut in the 3. Liga for the second team of VfB Stuttgart on 13 September 2014 in a 2–0 away victory against Hallescher FC. On 15 October 2015, Sama extended his contract with VfB Stuttgart until June 2018.

Greuther Fürth
On 3 January 2017, Sama joined 2. Bundesliga club Greuther Fürth on a -year contract.

On 30 January 2018, Sama joined VfL Osnabrück on loan from Greuther Fürth until the end of the 2017–18 season.

Heracles Almelo
In July 2018 he moved to Heracles Almelo.

Accrington Stanley
In September 2020 he moved to Accrington Stanley. Sama was released at the end of the 2021–22 season.

International career
Sama was born in Cameroon and moved to Germany, receiving his German citizenship in 2009. Sama has played for Germany U17, U18, U19 and U20. He participated with the German under-17 team in the 2010 UEFA European Under-17 Championship elite round. In 2011, he appeared for the under-19 team of Germany in the 2011 UEFA European Under-19 Championship elite qualification and in the 2012 UEFA European Under-19 Championship qualification.

References

External links
Stephen Sama at uefa.com

1993 births
Living people
People from Bamenda
German footballers
Germany youth international footballers
Cameroonian footballers
German people of Cameroonian descent
Cameroonian emigrants to Germany
Association football defenders
2. Bundesliga players
3. Liga players
Eredivisie players
Liverpool F.C. players
VfB Stuttgart II players
VfB Stuttgart players
SpVgg Greuther Fürth players
VfL Osnabrück players
Heracles Almelo players
Accrington Stanley F.C. players